Silver Run Creek is a  long 2nd order tributary to the Uwharrie River, in Randolph County, North Carolina.

Course
Silver Run Creek rises on the Robbins Branch (Hannahs Creek) divide on the west side of Brush Mountain in Randolph County, North Carolina.  Silver Run Creek then flows southwest to meet the Uwharrie River about 4 miles northeast of New Hope.

Watershed
Silver Run Creek drains  of area, receives about 46.9 in/year of precipitation, has a topographic wetness index of 362.51 and is about 72% forested.

See also
List of rivers of North Carolina

References

Rivers of North Carolina
Rivers of Randolph County, North Carolina